Ronja is a feminine given name in use largely in Scandinavian countries. It was invented by the Swedish author Astrid Lindgren for her 1981 children's book Ronja Rövardotter. In the English translation of the book the name was translated as Ronia. It may also be translated as Ronya.

It is also the Swedish rendering of the Russian diminutive Роня for Veronica.

Very few people were given this name in Scandinavian countries prior to 1981.

It was the third most popular name given to baby girls born in the Faroe Islands in 2008 and is also rising in popularity in other Scandinavian countries.

Notable bearers
Ronja Aronsson (born 1997), Swedish footballer
Ronja Eibl (born 1999), German cyclist
Ronja Hilbig (born 1990), German singer
Ronja Jenike (born 1989), German ice hockey player
Rina Ronja Kari (born 1985), Danish politician
Ronja Kemmer (born 1989), German politician
Ronja Oja (born 1992), Finnish Paralympic athlete
Ronja Mannov Olesen (born 1987), Danish actress
Ronja Savolainen (born 1997), Finnish ice hockey player
Ronja Schütte (born 1990), German rower
Ronja Richardsdotter Stanley (born 1991), Finnish singer, known as Ronya
Ronja Steinborn (born 1990), German modern pentathlete

References

Swedish feminine given names
Finnish feminine given names
German feminine given names